Ed John Brady (born June 17, 1962) is a former American football player.

Brady was raised in Morris, Illinois, and attended Morris Community High School, where he led the Morris Redskins football team to a state championship.  Brady played for the University of Illinois and was a member of the 1983 team which lost to UCLA 45–9 in the Rose Bowl.

Brady spent 12 seasons in the National Football League.  He was drafted by the Los Angeles Rams in the 8th round (215th overall pick) in the 1984 NFL Draft, and played for the Los Angeles Rams, Cincinnati Bengals and Tampa Bay Buccaneers.  As a member of the Bengals, he played in Super Bowl XXIII in 1989 in which Cincinnati lost to the San Francisco 49ers 20–16.  Listed as an outside linebacker, Brady only played a handful of downs at that position.  He played more than 180 career NFL games as a long snapper.  He was the captain of the Tampa Bay Buccaneers special teams unit from 1992 to 1995.  He retired in 1996 after failing to make the roster for the Jacksonville Jaguars.

Following his playing career, Brady became a high school football coach in Irvine, California. He currently is coaching inside linebackers and special teams at Lakota East High School in Liberty Township, Ohio.

References

1962 births
Living people
American football linebackers
Illinois Fighting Illini football players
Los Angeles Rams players
Cincinnati Bengals players
Tampa Bay Buccaneers players
People from Morris, Illinois